Lohaynny Caroline de Oliveira Vicente (born 2 May 1996) is a Brazilian badminton player who has qualified to compete at the 2016 Summer Olympics in her home city of Rio de Janeiro, Brazil.

Personal life 
Vicente was born on 2 May 1996 in Rio de Janeiro. Her older sister Luana Vicente is also an international badminton player. When Lohaynny was four years old and Luana was six, their father, a drug dealer, was killed in a shootout with police. Following her father's death her mother moved the family from the west of the city to Chacrinha, a favela in the north of Rio. She now lives with her sister in Campinas, São Paulo, in a house funded by the Brazilian Badminton Federation.

Career 
Both Vicente and her sister began playing badminton through a programme set up by a coach to teach the sport to children in the community.

At the 2014 Brazil International tournament, Vicente won a silver medal, losing to American Iris Wang in the final.

Vicente won a silver medal in the women's doubles at the 2015 Pan American Games held in Toronto, Ontario, Canada, playing alongside her sister Luana. The pair defeated Daigenis Saturria and Bermary Polanco of the Dominican Republic in the quarterfinals then Alex Bruce and Phyllis Chan of Canada in the semifinals. In the final they lost to the American pairing of Eva Lee and Paula Lynn Obañana by a score of 14−21, 6−21, to finish as runners-up. In the women's singles Vicente defeated Cuban Melissa Azcuy Perez then Chilean Tingting Chou before losing to eventual gold medallist Michelle Li by a score of 7–21, 8–21, in the quarterfinals.

Vicente was selected to compete for Brazil at the 2016 Summer Olympics in the women's singles as an automatic qualifier for the host nation.

Achievements

Pan American Games 
Women's doubles

Mixed doubles

Pan Am Championships 
Women's doubles

BWF International Challenge/Series (25 titles, 10 runner-up) 
Women's singles

Women's doubles

Mixed doubles

  BWF International Challenge tournament
  BWF International Series tournament
  BWF Future Series tournament

References

External links 
 
 

1996 births
Living people
Sportspeople from Rio de Janeiro (city)
Brazilian female badminton players
Badminton players at the 2016 Summer Olympics
Olympic badminton players of Brazil
Badminton players at the 2011 Pan American Games
Badminton players at the 2015 Pan American Games
Pan American Games silver medalists for Brazil
Pan American Games medalists in badminton
Medalists at the 2015 Pan American Games
21st-century Brazilian women